Phoroncidia is a genus of comb-footed spiders that was first described by J. O. Westwood in 1835.

Species
 it contains seventy-nine species and one subspecies, found worldwide:
P. aciculata Thorell, 1877 – Indonesia (Sulawesi)
P. aculeata Westwood, 1835 (type) – India, China
P. alishanensis Chen, 1990 – Taiwan
P. altiventris Yoshida, 1985 – Japan
P. alveolata (Simon, 1903) – Equatorial Guinea
P. ambatolahy Kariko, 2014 – Madagascar
P. americana (Emerton, 1882) – USA, Canada, Cuba, Jamaica
P. argoides (Doleschall, 1857) – Indonesia (Ambon)
P. aurata O. Pickard-Cambridge, 1877 – Madagascar
P. bifrons (Simon, 1895) – Philippines
P. biocellata (Simon, 1893) – Brazil
P. bukolana Barrion & Litsinger, 1995 – Philippines
P. capensis (Simon, 1895) – South Africa
P. concave Yin & Xu, 2012 – China
P. coracina (Simon, 1899) – Indonesia (Sumatra)
P. cribrata (Simon, 1893) – Paraguay
P. crustula Zhu, 1998 – China
P. cygnea (Hickman, 1951) – Australia (Tasmania)
P. eburnea (Simon, 1895) – South Africa
P. ellenbergeri Berland, 1913 – Gabon
P. escalerai (Simon, 1903) – Equatorial Guinea
P. flavolimbata (Simon, 1893) – Ecuador
P. floripara Gao & Li, 2014 – China
P. fumosa (Nicolet, 1849) – Chile
P. gayi (Nicolet, 1849) – Chile
P. gira Levi, 1964 – Venezuela
P. hankiewiczi (Kulczyński, 1911) – Portugal, Spain, France
P. hexacantha Thorell, 1890 – Indonesia (Sumatra)
P. jacobsoni (Reimoser, 1925) – Indonesia (Sumatra)
P. kibonotensis (Tullgren, 1910) – East Africa
Phoroncidia k. concolor (Caporiacco, 1949) – Kenya
P. levii Chrysanthus, 1963 – New Guinea
P. longiceps (Keyserling, 1886) – Brazil
P. lygeana (Walckenaer, 1841) – Malaysia, Indonesia (Sumatra, Java, Borneo)
P. maindroni (Simon, 1905) – India
P. minuta (Spassky, 1932) – Georgia, Azerbaijan
P. moyobamba Levi, 1964 – Peru, Brazil
P. musiva (Simon, 1880) – New Caledonia
P. nasuta (O. Pickard-Cambridge, 1873) – Sri Lanka, Taiwan, Japan
P. nicoleti (Roewer, 1942) – Chile
P. nicoleti Levi, 1964 – Chile
P. oahuensis (Simon, 1900) – Hawaii
P. paradoxa (Lucas, 1846) – Southern Europe, North Africa, Turkey
P. pennata (Nicolet, 1849) – Chile
P. personata (L. Koch, 1872) – Samoa, Fiji, Australia (Lord Howe Is.)
P. pilula (Karsch, 1879) – Georgia, Russia (Far East), China, Korea, Japan
P. pilula (Simon, 1895) – Tanzania (Zanzibar)
P. piratini Rodrigues & Marques, 2010 – Brazil
P. pukeiwa (Marples, 1955) – New Zealand
P. puketoru (Marples, 1955) – New Zealand
P. puyehue Levi, 1967 – Chile
P. quadrata (O. Pickard-Cambridge, 1880) – New Zealand
P. ravot Levi, 1964 – Venezuela
P. reimoseri Levi, 1964 – Brazil
P. roseleviorum Kariko, 2014 – Madagascar
P. rotunda (Keyserling, 1890) – Australia (Queensland, Lord Howe Is.), Samoa
P. rubens Thorell, 1899 – Cameroon
P. rubroargentea Berland, 1913 – Madagascar
P. rubromaculata (Keyserling, 1886) – Brazil
P. ryukyuensis Yoshida, 1979 – Taiwan, Japan (Ryukyu Is.)
P. saboya Levi, 1964 – Colombia
P. scutellata (Taczanowski, 1879) – Peru
P. scutula (Nicolet, 1849) – Bolivia, Chile
P. septemaculeata O. Pickard-Cambridge, 1873 – India, Sri Lanka, Malaysia
P. sextuberculata (Keyserling, 1890) – Australia (Queensland)
P. sjostedti Tullgren, 1910 – Tanzania
P. spissa (Nicolet, 1849) – Chile
P. splendida Thorell, 1899 – West Africa
P. studo Levi, 1964 – Peru, Brazil
P. testudo (O. Pickard-Cambridge, 1873) – India, Sri Lanka
P. thwaitesi O. Pickard-Cambridge, 1869 – Sri Lanka
P. tina Levi, 1964 – Brazil
P. tricuspidata (Blackwall, 1863) – Brazil
P. trituberculata (Hickman, 1951) – Australia (Tasmania)
P. triunfo Levi, 1964 – Mexico to Costa Rica
P. truncatula (Strand, 1909) – South Africa
P. umbrosa (Nicolet, 1849) – Chile
P. variabilis (Nicolet, 1849) – Chile
P. vatoharanana Kariko, 2014 – Madagascar
P. wrightae Kariko, 2014 – Madagascar

Formerly included:
P. flavomaculata (Keyserling, 1891) (Transferred to Dipoena)
P. sudabides (Bösenberg & Strand, 1906) (Transferred to Chrosiothes)

Nomen dubium
P. quadrispinella Strand, 1907

See also
 List of Theridiidae species

References

Further reading

Araneomorphae genera
Cosmopolitan spiders
Theridiidae